The Ajnad al-Sham (Soldiers of the Levant) was an independent Idlib and Hama-based rebel group active during the Syrian Civil War. The group is named after Ajnad al-Sham. It joined the Army of Conquest on 24 March 2015 and took part in the Second Battle of Idlib. On 29 March 2014, it announced that its military leader, Abu Abdullah Taoum, was killed during clashes around al-Fouaa.

History
On 5 November 2015, during the 2nd Northwestern Syria offensive, Ajnad al-Sham militants in the Hama Governorate killed and beheaded an unnamed Syrian Army Brigadier general and placed his head in a bin. They posted a picture of it on Facebook and Twitter where fellow militants praised this execution and labelled the Brigadier general with derogatory slogans like "Nusayri" - a term for Alawites.

In May 2016, a statement by the group threatened to retaliate against government forces if demands related to a prison riot in Hama were not met.

In February 2017, during clashes between Ahrar al-Sham, Hayat Tahrir al-Sham and the ISIL affiliated Jund al-Aqsa, the pro-opposition Syrian Observatory for Human Rights reported that Ajnad al-Sham came under attack from fighters from Jund al-Aqsa at their headquarters along with Saraya al-Ghuraba another Jihadist group, and during the attack, Jund al-Aqsa reportedly seized weapons and vehicles from Ajnad al-Sham and Saraya al-Ghuraba.

On 18 June 2017, after joining Hayat Tahrir al-Sham the group left HTS instead joining Ahrar al-Sham.

See also

List of armed groups in the Syrian Civil War

References

Anti-government factions of the Syrian civil war
Jihadist groups in Syria
Salafi Islamist groups
Organizations designated as terrorist by Malaysia